Ezra Nutter (21 November 1858 — 17 November 1903) was an English cricketer who played first-class cricket for Lancashire during the 1885 season. He was born in Colne and died in Nelson, Lancashire.

Nutter made just one first-class appearance for Lancashire, against Derbyshire in 1885. A tailender, he made just eighteen runs in the one and only innings in which he batted, as Lancashire ran out winners by a ten-wicket margin.

External links
Ezra Nutter at Cricket Archive 

1858 births
1903 deaths
English cricketers
Lancashire cricketers
People from Colne